Rosemary McKenna  (née Harvey; born 8 May 1941) is a Scottish Labour Party politician, who sat in the House of Commons of the United Kingdom from 1997 to 2010. She was elected as the Member of Parliament (MP) for Cumbernauld and Kilsyth at the 1997 general election, and held that seat until its abolition in boundary changes for the 2005 general election. She was then elected as the MP for the new Cumbernauld, Kilsyth and Kirkintilloch East, from which she stood down at the next election, in 2010.

Early life
Born to the Irish Cornelius Harvey and a Scottish mother, Susan, she went to St Augustine's RC Secondary School on Liddesdale Road in Milton, Glasgow. From 1958–65, she worked as a secretary. She joined the Labour Party in 1966 when she moved to Cumbernauld. She studied at the Roman Catholic Notre Dame College of Education, receiving a Diploma in Primary Education in 1974. She was a primary school teacher from 1974–94 before becoming a local councillor and eventual Provost of the former Cumbernauld and Kilsyth District Council.

Parliamentary career
McKenna was first elected in 1997 to represent the former Cumbernauld and Kilsyth seat, which she retained at the 2001 election.

The seat was abolished for the 2005 general election and she contested the new Cumbernauld, Kilsyth and Kirkintilloch East constituency, winning with a 1.1% swing against her to the Scottish National Party. She retired at the 2010 general election.

She was responsible for chairing the Labour Party's vetting procedure for candidates for the first election for the Scottish Parliament.  This process saw many of the more left-oriented candidates rejected, including Dennis Canavan, Ian Davidson, Michael Connarty, all of whom were sitting Members of Parliament at the time, as well as Tommy Sheppard, a former Assistant General Secretary of the Labour Party in Scotland.

Personal life
She married James McKenna. They have three sons and one daughter.

References

External links 
 
 Guardian Unlimited Politics – Ask Aristotle: Rosemary McKenna MP
 Voting Record at the Public Whip

1941 births
Living people
Scottish Labour MPs
Female members of the Parliament of the United Kingdom for Scottish constituencies
Commanders of the Order of the British Empire
Politicians from Glasgow
Provosts in Scotland
Scottish people of Irish descent
UK MPs 1997–2001
UK MPs 2001–2005
UK MPs 2005–2010
Women provosts in Scotland
Scottish Labour councillors
20th-century Scottish women politicians
20th-century Scottish politicians
21st-century Scottish women politicians
21st-century Scottish politicians